The Kimberley rock monitor (Varanus glauerti) is a medium-sized species of monitor lizard in the family Varanidae. The species is native to Northern Australia. Also known as Glauert's monitor or the Kakadu sand goanna, it belongs to the subgenus Odatria.

Etymology
The specific name, glauerti, is in honor of English-born Australian herpetologist Ludwig Glauert.

Description

Habitat and behaviour
Varanus glauerti lives almost exclusively on rocky cliff faces, but is found in humid forests. It is rupicolous, and prefers humid conditions.

References

Further reading
Mertens R (1957). "Two new goannas from Australia". Western Australian Naturalist 5: 183–185. (Varanus timorensis glauerti, new subspecies).

External links
Reptiliana.wordpress.com

Varanus
Reptiles of Western Australia
Reptiles described in 1957
Reptiles of the Northern Territory
Monitor lizards of Australia
Taxa named by Robert Mertens